The Statistical Office of the Republic of Serbia (or RBS) is a specialized government agency of Serbia charged with collecting and disseminating official statistics.

History
Official statistics in the Republic of Serbia was established in 1862, when Prince Mihailo Obrenovic passed an act granting powers to the economic department of the Ministry of Finance concerning all statistical work. This was the beginning of state statistics in Serbia, but historic data suggest there was even earlier collecting of statistical data on tax payers, census of the cattle (in 1824) and regular population censuses (from 1834), as well as, since 1843, regular monitoring of statistical data on external trade, domestic trade, prices and wages. 
Statistical work was performed even before the foundation of the National Statistical Office through participation of Serbian representatives at international congresses of statisticians held in the Hague in 1859, in Berlin in 1863 and in Florence in 1867. 
The Law on the Organization of Statistics was enacted in 1881 and in 1882 the Ministry of National Economy assumed responsibility regarding national statistics.
State Statistics of Serbia has been a member of the International Statistical Institute since its foundation in 1885. 
The State Statistics Directorate was founded in 1919 in the scope of the Ministry of Social Policy of the Kingdom of Serbs, Croats and Slovenes, but a separate Statistical Office of Serbia was opened only in 1945.
Regarding the publishing activity, the first State Statistics of Serbia was published in 1863 and the first results of Population Census in 1863. The first Statistical Yearbook of the Kingdom of Serbia was published in 1893 and in 1894 the State Statistics was published for the last time. The last Statistical Yearbook of the Kingdom of Serbia was published in 1910. In 1954 a special edition of the Statistical Yearbook of Serbia was re-published, as a complex statistical publication that encompassed the results of versatile statistical surveys. 
The Statistical Office of the Republic of Serbia was founded in 1945.
In the period 1945-2006 the Statistical Office of the Republic of Serbia was inferior to the Federal Statistical Office regarding the process of conducting unique programs of statistical surveys and methodologies. Simultaneously, the Office has been completely independent regarding financial and human resources and other issues.

References

External links

Government of Serbia
Demographics of Serbia
Government agencies established in 1862
1860s establishments in Serbia